The 1893–94 Scottish Cup was the 21st season of Scotland's most prestigious football knockout competition. The Cup was won by Rangers when they beat Celtic 3–1 in the final. It was the first Scottish Cup final between the two Glasgow clubs, whose dominance of the domestic game and 'old firm' rivalry were yet to be established – indeed this was the first time Rangers lifted the trophy in their third appearance at that stage (and their first since the 1870s); for Celtic it was a third defeat in four finals, all within the past six years.

Calendar

First round

Second round

Second round replay

Quarter-final

Quarter-final replay

Quarter-final second replay

Semi-finals

Semi-final replay

Final

Teams

See also
1893–94 in Scottish football

References

RSSF Scottish Cup 93-94

1893-1894
Cup
Cup